Thaumaleidae, the solitary midges or trickle midges, are a group of nematoceran flies related to the Ceratopogonidae, Chironomidae, and the Simuliidae.  They are small, stocky, yellow to brown flies (3–4 mm). Very few species are known for this family (about 120 species in five genera).  Larvae are found in films on rocks and the nonfeeding adults are usually found on foliage along the same streams in which the larvae are found. A few solitary midges are found in the Southern Hemisphere, but Thaumaleidae are generally an Holarctic family.

Description
Adults are recognised by the seven veins reaching the margin, the costa running around the entire margin, the absence of ocelli, and particularly by the short antennae which are no longer than the head.
 
Larvae resemble larval Lutzomyia (Psychodidae), Forcipomyia (Ceratopogonidae), and some  Chironomidae. However, unpaired prolegs, a ventrally directed truncate head, and prothoracic spiracles on a short respiratory tube differentiate them.

For further information see * Family keys and image

Biology
Adult Thaumaleidae are encountered infrequently, usually close to the hygropetric aquatic larval habitat. The undersides of bridges over smaller running waters are common adult gathering sites.
Thaumaleid larvae are usually hygropetric in vertical, thin water films alongside waterfalls and torrents. They prefer low temperatures and are most frequent in fully shaded localities. They feed by grazing on diatoms. Little or no life history information is available.

Name
The dipteran family name Orphnephilidae Rondani, 1847, based on Orphnephila Haliday, 1832, was used until Bezzi (1913) synonymized Orphnephila with Thaumalea Ruthe, 1831 and adopted Thaumaleidae, based on the senior synonym Thaumalea. This family name has been almost universally used since that time and it is to be maintained. Had Thaumaleidae not come into prevailing usage, Orphnephilidae would continue in use despite the fact that Orphnephila is a junior synonym. Thaumaleidae is cited with its own author and date, followed by the date of the replaced name in parentheses: Thaumaleidae Bezzi, 1913 (1847). It takes precedence over Orphnephilidae Rondani, 1847, and any subsequently published synonyms.

References
Arnaud, P.H. 1977. Thaumaleidae. pp. 283–85. In: Hurlbert, S.H., ed. Biota Acuatica de Sudamérica Austral Siendo una Recopilacion de Bibliografias Taxonomicas Referentes a la Fauna y Flora de Aguas Continentales de Sur de Sudamérica. San Diego State University, San Diego.
Arnaud, P.H. and I.A. Boussy. 1994. The adult Thaumaleidae (Diptera: Culicomorpha) of western America. Myia 5: 41-152.
Bezzi, M. 1913. Taumaleidi (Orfnefilidi) italiani con descrizione di nuove specie. Bollettino del Laboratorio di Zoologia Generale e Agraria del Reale Istituto Superiore Agrario di Portici 7: 227-266.
Boussy, I.A., J.M. Gillespie, and P.H. Arnaud, Jr. 1994. External structure of larval Thaumalea buckae Arnaud and Boussy (Diptera: Thaumaleidae). Myia 5: 195-201.
Gillespie, J.M., W.F. Barr, and S.T. Elliott. 1994. The taxonomy and biology of the immature stages of species of Thaumalea occurring in Idaho and California (Diptera: Thaumaleidae). Myia 5: 153-193.
McLellan, I.D. 1983. New diagnosis for genus Austrothaumalea, and redescription of A. neozealandica (Diptera: Thaumaleidae). New Zealand Journal of Zoology 10: 267-270.
McLellan, I.D. 1988. A revision of New Zealand Thaumaleidae (Diptera: Nematocera) with descriptions of new species and a new genus. New Zealand Journal of Zoology 15: 563-575.
Sinclair, B.J. 1996. A review of the Thaumaleidae (Diptera: Culicomorpha) of eastern North America, including a redefinition of genus Androprosopa Mik. Entomologica Scandinavica 27: 361-376.
Sinclair, B.J. 2000. Immature stages of Australian Austrothaumalea Tonnoir and Niphta Theischinger (Diptera: Thaumaleidae). Australian Journal of Entomology 39: 171-176.
Stone, A. and B.V. Peterson. 1981. Thaumaleidae. pp. 351–353. In: McAlpine, J.F., B.V. Peterson, G.E. Shewell, H.J. Teskey, J.R. Vockeroth, and D.M. Wood, eds. Manual of Nearctic Diptera. Volume 1. Agriculture Canada Monograph 27. Ottawa.
Stuckenberg, B. 1960. A new genus and species of Thaumaleidae from South Africa (Diptera). Proceedings of the Royal Entomological Society, London 29: 107-109.
Stuckenberg, B. 1961. Diptera (Nematocera): Thaumaleidae. South African Animal Life 8: 409-412.
Theischinger, G. 1986. Australian Thaumaleidae (Insecta: Diptera). Records of the Australian Museum 38: 291-317.
Theischinger, G. 1988. Austrothaumalea bickeli spec. nov., a new thaumaleid from Australia (Insecta: Diptera: Thaumaleidae). Stapfia 17: 211-213.

External links
 Thaumeleidae page at the Bishop Museum's Australasian/Oceanian Diptera Catalog

 
Nematocera families